Sugar Loaf Island is a small, privately owned island that is located a few hundred metres off the coast of the northeast corner of Grenada, near Levera National Park. It is part of a small archipelago and is in close proximity to Green Island and Sandy Island, which are both uninhabited. A cottage is located at the southwest end of the island.

References

Islands of Grenada
Private islands of the Caribbean